Pomegranate carved in the round is an ivory bead shaped like a pomegranate. It is dated to the 8th century B.C. and is attributed to the Assyrian Empire. The ivory bead is currently held by the Metropolitan Museum of Art in its collection.

Description 
The ivory bead is shaped like a pomegranate, an object commonly depicted in Assyrian art. The reddish color of the bead was not intended; rather, the object is stained as a result of being buried in the ruins of Kalhu. A product of the trade routes of the Bronze Age Civilizations, the ivory used in the making of the piece was likely imported from Egypt.

References 

Jewellery of the Metropolitan Museum of Art
Assyrian art and architecture
Ivory works of art